Motor City Motors is a garage based competition reality television show on the Discovery Channel hosted by the Detroit Brothers. During development, the show was referred to as MG: Motor City, a successor to the similar Discovery show Monster Garage.

The first episode aired on Monday, December 28, 2009 at 9:00pm.  The first season has thirteen episodes.

Premise of the show
Teams of five or six builders are given five days to create a build conceived by the Detroit Brothers.  If successful, each builder gets a tool package worth over $5,000.00.

External links
 Motor City Motors Website 
 Detroit Bros. Website 

Automotive television series
Culture of Detroit
Discovery Channel original programming
2000s American reality television series
2009 American television series debuts
Television shows set in Detroit
2010 American television series endings
2010s American reality television series